Oleksiy Kashchuk (born 29 June 2000) is a Ukrainian professional footballer who plays as a midfielder for Sabah, on loan from Shakhtar Donetsk.

Career
Born in Novohrad-Volynskyi, Zhytomyr Oblast, Kashchuk is a product of Vorskla Poltava youth sportive school system.

He made his debut for FC Mariupol in the Ukrainian Premier League as a second-half substitute against FC Oleksandriya on 3 August 2019.

On 29 March 2022, Azerbaijan Premier League club Sabah announced the signing of Kashchuk on loan until the end of the season.

International career
Kashchuk was a part of the Ukraine national under-20 football team that won the 2019 FIFA U-20 World Cup. He played one of the key roles in Ukraine's success, appearing in all 7 of his team's matches.

Honours
Ukraine U20
 FIFA U-20 World Cup: 2019

References

External links
 
 

2000 births
Living people
People from Zviahel
Ukrainian footballers
Ukrainian expatriate footballers
FC Mariupol players
Sabah FC (Azerbaijan) players
Ukrainian Premier League players
Azerbaijan Premier League players
Association football midfielders
Ukraine youth international footballers
Ukraine under-21 international footballers
Ukrainian expatriate sportspeople in Azerbaijan
Expatriate footballers in Azerbaijan
Sportspeople from Zhytomyr Oblast